Jim Hodder may refer to:

 Jim Hodder (musician) (1947–1990), American drummer
 Jim Hodder (politician) (born 1940), Canadian politician for Port au Port